Lawrence O'Brien or Larry O'Brien could refer to: 

Larry O'Brien (1917–1990), American politician and basketball commissioner
Larry O'Brien Championship Trophy, award presented by the National Basketball Association to the winner of the NBA Finals, named for the above
Larry O'Brien (Canadian politician) (born 1949), former mayor of Ottawa, Ontario
Lawrence D. O'Brien (1951–2004), member of the Canadian House of Commons from Labrador
Larry O'Brien, former director of the Glenn Miller Orchestra

See also
Laurence O'Brien  (1792–1870), Irish-Canadian merchant and member of the Newfoundland and Labrador House of Assembly